Ray Charles In Concert is a limited edition compilation album of live performances by Ray Charles released in 2003 by Rhino Handmade.  The tracks were all previously released on 5 different Ray Charles live concert albums released between 1958 and 1975.

Track listing
Disc one:
 "Night Time Is the Right Time" (Ozzie Cadena, Lew Herman) – 3:58
 "Talkin' 'Bout You" (Ray Charles) – 4:30
 "A Fool for You" (Charles) – 7:05
 "Swanee River Rock" (Charles) - 2:07
 "The Spirit-Feel" (Milt Jackson) - 4:23
 "Yes Indeed!" (Sy Oliver) - 2:39
 "What'd I Say" (Charles) - 4:22
 "Come Rain or Come Shine" (Johnny Mercer, Harold Arlen) - 7:40
 "Hit the Road Jack" (Percy Mayfield) - 2:20
 "The Danger Zone" (Mayfield) - 3:45
 "Bye Bye Love" (Felice Bryant, Boudleaux Bryant) - 2:00
 "Georgia On My Mind" (Hoagy Carmichael, Stuart Gorrell) - 6:16
 "One Mint Julep"  (Rudolph Toombs) - 3:01
 "I Believe to my Soul" (Charles) - 3:50
 "Unchain My Heart"(Teddy Powell, Robert Sharp, Jr.) - 3:07
 "Baby, Don't You Cry" (Johnson, Washington) – 2:42
Disc two:
 "Hallelujah, I Love Her So" (Charles) – 3:00
 "You Don't Know Me" (Eddy Arnold, Cindy Walker) – 3:10
 "I Got a Woman" (Charles, Richard) – 6:11
 "Hide nor Hair" (Mayfield) – 2:55
 "Margie" (Con Conrad, Benny Davis, Russel Robinson) – 2:51
 "Don't Set Me Free" (Powell) – 3:36
 "Let the Good Times Roll" (Sam Theard, Fleecie Moore) – 3:09
 "Busted" (Harlan Howard) – 2:10
 "Don't Let Her Know" (Buck Owens, Don Rich, Bonnie Owens) – 4:23
 "Then We'll Be Home" (Sadye Shepard) – 4:02
 "I Can't Stop Loving You" (Don Gibson) – 3:15
 "Feel So Bad" (Leslie Temple, James Johnsonl) – 9:57
 "Living for the City" (Stevie Wonder) – 8:06

(Disc 1, tracks 1, 2, 3 originally released on Ray Charles at Newport)  
(Disc 1, track 4 originally released on Ray Charles Live)
(Disc 1, tracks 5, 6, 7 originally released on Ray Charles in Person)
(Disc 1, tracks 8 ~ 15 originally released on Berlin, 1962)
(Disc 1, track 16 and disk  2, tracks 1 ~ 6 originally released on Ray Charles: Live in Concert)
(Disc 2, tracks 7 ~ 13 originally released on Ray Charles: Live in Japan)

Personnel

1958 Newport Jazz Festival performance
(Disk 1, tracks 1~4)
Ray Charles – piano, vocals
Marcus Belgrave – trumpet
Lee Harper – trumpet
David "Fathead" Newman – alto saxophone, tenor saxophone
Bennie "Hank" Crawford – baritone saxophone
Edgar Willis – bass
Richie Goldberg – drums
The Raeletts – backing vocals
Margie Hendrix
Pat Lyle
Darlene MacRea
Nesuhi Ertegun – producer

1959 Atlanta concert
(Disk 1, tracks 5~7)
Ray Charles – piano, vocals, alto saxophone (on "The Spirit Feel")
Margie Hendrix – vocals
Marcus Belgrave – trumpet
John Hunt – trumpet
David "Fathead" Newman – alto saxophone, tenor saxophone
Bennie "Hank" Crawford – baritone saxophone
Edgar Willis – bass
Teagle Fleming – drums
The Raeletts – backing vocals
Margie Hendrix
Pat Lyle
Darlene MacRea
Zenas Sears – producer

1962 Berlin concert
(Disk 1, tracks 8 ~ 15)
Ray Charles – piano, vocals
Marcus Belgrave – trumpet
Wallace Davenport – trumpet
Philip Guilbeau – trumpet
John Hunt – trumpet
Henderson Chambers – trombone
James Harbert – trombone
Frederic "Keg" Johnson – trombone
Dickie Wells – trombone
Bennie "Hank" Crawford – alto saxophone
Rudy Powell – alto saxophone
David "Fathead" Newman – tenor saxophone, alto saxophone, flute
Don Wilkerson – tenor saxophone
Leroy "Hog" Cooper – baritone saxophone
Elbert "Sonny" Forriest – guitar
Edgar Willis – bass
Edward "Bruno" Carr – drums
The Raeletts – backing vocals
Gwen Berry
Margie Hendrix
Pat Lyle
Darlene MacRea
Norman Granz – producer

1964 Los Angeles concert
(Disk 1, track 16 and disk 2, tracks 1 ~ 6)
Ray Charles – piano, vocals
Oliver Beener – trumpet
Wallace Davenport – trumpet
Philip Guilbeau – trumpet
John Hunt – trumpet, flugelhorn
Henderson Chambers – trombone
James Harbert – trombone
Frederic "Keg" Johnson – trombone
Julian Priester – trombone
Bennie "Hank" Crawford – alto saxophone
William "Buddy" Pearson – alto saxophone, flute
David "Fathead" Newman – tenor saxophone
Leroy "Hog" Cooper – baritone saxophone
Elbert "Sonny" Forriest – guitar
Edgar Willis – bass
Wilbert Hogan – drums
The Raeletts – backing vocals
Gwen Berry
Lillian Forte
Pat Lyle
Darlene MacRae
Sid Feller – producer

1975 Tokyo and Yokohama concerts
(Disk 2, tracks 7 ~ 13)
Ray Charles – piano, vocals, producer
Bob Caulsen – trumpet
Johnny Coles – trumpet
Jack Evans – trumpet
Steve Davis – trombone
Wally Huff – trombone
Ken Tussing – trombone
Eddie Pratt – alto saxophone
Clifford Solomon – alto saxophone
James Clay – tenor saxophone
Andrew Ennis – tenor saxophone
Leroy "Hog" Cooper – baritone saxophone
Earnest Vantrease – organ
Tony Mathews – guitar
Edgar Willis – bass
Scott von Ravensberg –  drums
The Raeletts – backing vocals
Susaye Greene
Mable John
Vernita Moss
Estelle Yarborough

References

Further reading
Ray Charles: In Concert (Rhino Handmade) liner notes
In Concert at [ Allmusic.com]

Ray Charles compilation albums
Ray Charles live albums
Albums produced by Nesuhi Ertegun
Albums produced by Sid Feller
Albums produced by Norman Granz
Albums produced by Ray Charles
2003 live albums
2003 compilation albums
Rhino Handmade live albums
Rhino Handmade compilation albums